Glanidium melanopterum is a species of driftwood catfishes found in the Piquete of São Paulo, Brazil in South America.

References

Soares-Porto, L.M., 1998. Monophyly and interrelationships of the Centromochlinae (Siluriformes: Auchenipteridae). p. 331-350. In L.R. Malabarba, R.E. Reis, R.P. Vari, Z.M.S. Lucena and C.A.S. Lucena (eds.) Phylogeny and classification of neotropical fishes. Porto Alegre: EDIPUCRS. 

Auchenipteridae
Catfish of South America
Taxa named by Alípio de Miranda-Ribeiro
Fish described in 1918